Dan O'Donnell (born 5 April 1995), better known as D.O.D, is a British DJ and record producer. He debuted at number 96 at the DJ Mag Top 100 DJs list.

Biography
Active since 2009, D.O.D. was supported at his beginning by renowned artists such as Laidback Luke, with Mixmash Records hosting most of D.O.D.'s productions.

A collaboration between him and Laidback Luke, called "Flashing Lights", was released in April 2014.

D.O.D. performed at Ultra Europe in 2016. D.O.D. released "Blip" on 7 November 2016, with which he decided to define his own genre. He dubbed this new sound "Future Jack". The song was primarily characterised by its heavy electronic sounds and repetitive nature. Many of the sounds are reminiscent of a song he released earlier that year called "Taking You Back", which Afrojack worked on as well. His following releases "Don't Wait" with Tommy Trash and "Ghetto" continued this sound.

Discography

Extended plays

Charting singles

Singles

Remixes and edits
 2009: Chris Brown featuring Lil Wayne and Swizz Beatz – "I Can Transform Ya" (D.O.D Remix) [Jive]
 2010: Lil Wayne featuring Drake – "Right Above It" (D.O.D Remix) [Young Money]
 2011: Laidback Luke, Lil Jon and Steve Aoki – "Turbulence" (D.O.D Remix) [Bitrate Records]
 2012: DJ Fresh featuring Dizzee Rascal – "The Power" (D.O.D Remix) [Ministry of Sound]
 2013: Laidback Luke and Dimitri Vegas & Like Mike – "MORE" (D.O.D Remix) [Mixmash Records]
 2014: Laidback Luke and Project 46 – "Collide" (featuring Collin McLoughlin) (D.O.D Remix) [Mixmash Records]
 2014: DJ Jean – "The Launch" (D.O.D Remix Radio Edit) [Dizplay Recordings]
 2015: Shawn Mendes – "Stitches" (D.O.D Remix) [Island Records]
 2016: Justin Timberlake – Can't Stop the Feeling! [RCA Records]
 2017: Afrojack and David Guetta featuring Ester Dean – "Another Life" (D.O.D Remix) [Wall Recordings]
 2018: Cedric Gervais featuring Wealth - "One Night" (D.O.D Remix) [Island Records]
 2018: Rebecca & Fiona vs D.O.D - "Need You" (D.O.D Remix) [Stereo Stereo]
 2018: Le Cheval - "Fandango" (D.O.D Remix)
 2019: Steve Angello and Laidback Luke - "Be" (D.O.D Remix)
 2021: Afrojack and Chico Rose - "You Got The Love" (D.O.D Remix)

Notes
 A  "Bananas" did not enter the Ultratop 50, but peaked at number 14 on the Dance Bubbling Under chart.

References

External links
Official website

British dance musicians
British DJs
British record producers
Living people
People from Lancaster, Lancashire
Remixers
1995 births